Sir Frank Morrish Baddeley,  (30 November 1874 – 18 April 1966) was a British colonial administrator.

Life
Educated at the Liverpool Institute and Magdalene College, Cambridge, Baddeley joined the Malayan Civil Service in 1897, rising to the rank of Under Secretary of the Straits Settlements. He became Chief Secretary to the Government of Nigeria in 1924. He was acting Governor of Nigeria in 1925, 1927, and in 1928–1929. He represented Nigeria at the 1930 Colonial Office Conference.

He was appointed Companion of the Order of St Michael and St George in 1925, knighted in 1928, and appointed Knight Commander of the Order of the British Empire in 1930.

References

Chief Secretaries of Nigeria
1966 deaths
1874 births
Knights Bachelor
Companions of the Order of St Michael and St George
Knights Commander of the Order of the British Empire
British colonial governors and administrators
British people in British Nigeria
British people in British Malaya